Axel-Herman Nilsson (December 31, 1894 – May 12, 1969) was a Swedish Nordic skier who competed in the 1920s. He was born and died in Stockholm. Nilsson competed in the first two Winter Olympics in the individual large hill ski jumping, finishing sixth in the 1924 competition and fourth in 1928 event. He also finished fifth in the Nordic combined competition in 1924.

References
Axel-Herman Nilsson's profile at Sports Reference.com

1894 births
1969 deaths
Sportspeople from Stockholm
Swedish male Nordic combined skiers
Swedish male ski jumpers
Olympic Nordic combined skiers of Sweden
Olympic ski jumpers of Sweden
Nordic combined skiers at the 1924 Winter Olympics
Ski jumpers at the 1924 Winter Olympics
Ski jumpers at the 1928 Winter Olympics